Bear Creek is a stream in Marion and Ralls counties in the U.S. state of Missouri. It is a tributary of the Mississippi River. The creek enters the Mississippi on the southeast side of Hannibal.

Bear Creek was named for the fact bears were hunted there by pioneer citizens.

See also
List of rivers of Missouri

References

Rivers of Marion County, Missouri
Rivers of Ralls County, Missouri
Rivers of Missouri